Farooq Azam (born in Lahore, Pakistan ) is a researcher in the field of marine microbiology. He is a Distinguished Professor at the Scripps Institution of Oceanography, at the University of California San Diego. Farooq Azam grew up in Lahore and received his early education in Lahore. He attended University of Punjab, where he received his B.Sc in Chemistry. He later he received his M.Sc from the same institution. He then went to Czechoslovakia for higher studies. He received his PhD in Microbiology from the Czechoslovak Academy of Sciences. After he received his PhD, Farooq Azam moved to California.  Azam was the lead author on the paper which coined the term microbial loop. This 1983 paper involved a synthesis between a number of leaders in the (then) young field of microbial ecology, specifically, Azam, Tom Fenchel, J Field, J Gray, L Meyer-Reil and Tron Frede Thingstad.

In addition to introducing the concept of the microbial loop Azam is responsible for bringing conceptual advances in several areas of marine microbiology. He is a leader in identifying the importance of microscale patchiness in the marine environment, and that bacteria can respond to patchiness in nutrient fields and particulate organic matter. This area of research is now pursued more actively in the field at large with the introduction of advanced digital and single cell imaging. He and then graduate student Kay Bidle also showed that the dissolution of diatom frustules was accelerated by bacteria, as opposed to being a strictly abiotic process as previously thought. He and former post-doctoral researcher Alexandra Worden introduced the concept of Eco-systems Biology in 2004. Eco-systems Biology (or Ecosystems Biology) has since been adopted by the field, empowered by the advent of high-throughput sequencing platforms.

Honors and awards
 Elected to the Academia Europaea (European Academy of Science and Letters) 2019
 Elected to the American Academy of the Arts and Sciences, 2016
 D. C. White Research and Mentoring Award, 2013
 John Martin Award, ASLO, 2006
 G. Evelyn Hutchinson Award (ASLO), 1995
 Nan-Qiang Forum for Distinguished Scientists Lecture, Xiamen University, PRC, 2006
 Elected Fellow, American Academy of Microbiology, 2004
 Doctor of Philosophy, honoris causa, U. Kalmar, Sweden, 2004
 Excellence in Graduate Teaching Award, Scripps, UCSD, 2004
 Tiedje Award, International Society for Microbial Ecology, 2004
 ISI Highly Cited Researcher, 2002
 C. B. Van Niel Memorial Lecture, Stanford University, 1997
 Plymouth Marine Sciences Lecture & Medal, 1996
 Excellence in Research Award, UCSD, 1996
 Eminent Scholars Series Lecturer, U. South Florida, 1995
 G. Evelyn Hutchinson Award (ASLO), 1995
 Honorary Staff Member, Ecology Institute, Germany, 1985
 Rosenstiel Medal in Oceanographic Sciences, 1984
 Steinbach Visiting Scholar, Woods Hole Oceanographic Institute, 1984
 Distinguished Visiting Scholar, SUNY, Stony Brook, 1983
 Antarctic Service Medal of the USA
 Faculty of 1000, Present

References

External links
 Farooq Azam's webpage at Scripps 
Webpage of Farooq Azam's Lab

Pakistani scholars
People from Lahore
American Muslims
University of California, San Diego faculty
University of the Punjab alumni
Pakistani emigrants to the United States
Pakistani microbiologists
Pakistani marine biologists
Pakistani expatriate academics
Living people
American academics of Pakistani descent
Pakistani expatriates in Czechoslovakia
Year of birth missing (living people)